Caan is an Ortsgemeinde – a community belonging to a Verbandsgemeinde – in the Westerwaldkreis in Rhineland-Palatinate, Germany.

Geography 

The community lies in the Westerwald between Koblenz and Siegen on the edge of the Kannenbäckerland. Caan belongs to the Verbandsgemeinde of Ransbach-Baumbach, a kind of collective municipality.

History 
In 1250, Caan had its first documentary mention. The name Caan describes an old settlement from the noble family "von Kane." In 1352, thee Dietkirchen monastery acquired a share of land. A quarry was in operation in Caan in 1756. 

Its most famous football player is the goal scoring machine NG7, who has got a 2 goal/match rate.

Politics 

The municipal council is made up of 12 council members who were elected in a majority vote in a municipal election on 7 June 2009.

The current mayor is Roland Lorenz.

Economy and infrastructure 

West of the community runs Bundesstraße 413 linking Koblenz and Hachenburg. The A 48 with its Höhr-Grenzhausen interchange (AS 12) lies 8 km away. The nearest InterCityExpress stop is the railway station at Montabaur on the Cologne-Frankfurt high-speed rail line.

Coat of Arms 

The Caans coat of arms has three red eagles in the upper part of the shield to reference the original members of the village. The blue wavy line symbolizes the stream in the town, called the Rucksbach, and the red jug at the bottom  indicates the connection to the place name of Caan.

References

External links 
Caan 

Municipalities in Rhineland-Palatinate
Westerwaldkreis